Culture & Arts Center Station, formerly Arts Center Station is a subway station on Line 1 of the Incheon Subway. It is located next to the Incheon Culture & Arts Center and the Incheon Olympic Park in the Incheon Bus Terminal area of central Incheon.

Station layout

Exits

References

Metro stations in Incheon
Seoul Metropolitan Subway stations
Railway stations in South Korea opened in 1999
Namdong District